The European Women's U-19 European Handball Championship is the official competition for junior women's national handball teams of Europe. Organized by the European Handball Federation, it takes place every two years. The competition received its current name in 2004, until then it was known as the European Women's Junior Handball Championship. 

In addition to crowning the European champions, the tournament also serves as a qualifying tournament for the Women's Junior World Handball Championship.

Medal summary

Notes
 On 3 April 2018, the Russian team was disqualified and stripped of their silver medals, won at the 2017 edition, due to doping violations committed by three players on the team.

Medal count

See also 
 Junior World Championship
 Youth European Championship 
 Youth World Championship

Footnotes

External links
 Official homepage of the European Handball Federation
 Results

 
European Handball Federation competitions
Youth handball
Women's handball competitions
Handball
1996 establishments in Europe
Recurring sporting events established in 1996